Cle Elum is a city in Kittitas County, Washington, United States. The population was 1,872 at the 2010 census. About  by car from Seattle, Cle Elum is a popular area for camping and outdoor activities.

History

Native history 
Cle Elum was originally inhabited by the Kittitas band of the Yakama tribe. The tribe fished salmon, steelhead, and trout from the Yakima River. The Salmon la Sac trails in the northern area of the region were created by the Kittitas people and were used as layovers for journeys into the higher altitudes of the Cascade Range. In 1855, after the arrival of Catholic missionaries, and the passing through of settlers and coal miners on their way to the Puget Sound, a treaty resulted in the Yakamas ceding most of their land for a reservation in the lower Yakima Valley and guaranteed access to fish, including what would later be incorporated as Cle Elum. By 1859, the Kittitas had been forced to relocate to the Yakama Indian Reservation.

Early years and industries 
In the spring of 1886, Northern Pacific Railway surveyors Virgil Bogue and Herbert Huson were making their way through the region with the intent of establishing a station. At the site of the future city, a depot was named Clealum after the Kittitas name Tle-el-Lum (tlielləm), meaning "swift water", referring to the Cle Elum River. Maps of the United States Postal Guide used two words while other early maps show it as one word: Clealum. In 1908, Clealum was altered to Cle Elum. The name was given to the river, the city, and Cle Elum Lake. Walter Reed entered into a partnership with Thomas Johnson of Ellensburg and laid out sixty-five acres as a town site which was legally dedicated on July 26, 1886. Mr. Johnson had owned a sawmill on Wilson Creek, in Grant County and he moved the mill to the new location in the vicinity of the new town. The partners Reed and Johnson established what was undoubtedly the largest mill up to that time in central or Eastern Washington, cutting 40,000 feet of board lumber per day. At the same time, Frederick Leonhard, who, with his brother-in-law, Gerrit d'Ablaing, had been carrying on a mill on Cooke Creek and later on the Naneum, moved to the vicinity of Cle Elum. They cut a large part of the lumber for the Stampede Tunnel.

The early 20th century

Cle Elum was officially incorporated on February 12, 1902.

Tragedy struck the area when on July 16, 1908, two carloads of blasting powder being unloaded by the Northwest Improvement Company exploded, killing at least nine people including miners, NIC store employees and a family with children living in a tent near the building. The explosion, located about three-quarters of a mile from Cle Elum's downtown, scattered debris and human remains and shattered windows across town. Accounts from residents equated the explosion to an earthquake.

In December 1910, loggers working for the Cascade Lumber Company near Cle Elum went on strike after the company reduced pay and began charging $5 per week for board.

In 1913, steps were taken to improve automobile access across the Cascade Mountains via Snoqualmie Pass. A $1,500,000 levy was approved in 1913 to improve and expand the state's highways. The majority of the levy ($590,743) went to construction of the Sunset Highway between Spokane and Seattle. This major cross-state highway would pass directly through Cle Elum's business district, and as it was one of the first towns reached after traveling east across the pass, would greatly benefit from its construction. That same year, reflecting on the prosperity of the coal mines, the city's second bank was chartered. By 1914, Cle Elum's population had risen to 3,000 from about 100 at the turn of the 20th century.

Great fire of 1918
Cle Elum's greatest disaster occurred on June 25, 1918, when a huge fire wiped out over seventy acres of the city (29 city blocks) causing over $500,000 (about $ today) in damages. The cause was later determined to most likely to be a cigarette butt thrown into a pile of garbage behind a theater. Thirty businesses and 205 houses were destroyed, leaving more than 1,800 people homeless. Following the incident, aid from across the state began pouring in. The Red Cross brought tents from Camp Lewis to house displaced citizens while soldiers were sent from Ellensburg to guard businesses. Yakima and Portland also sent aid to the city. No people died in the incident.

High insurance rates on Cle Elum's many wooden structures inhibited many people from purchasing them. One of the few buildings in downtown Cle Elum to survive the fire was the Cle Elum State Bank Building, built in 1906; it still stands today. The rest of downtown was quickly rebuilt with brick and many of these buildings still stand.

Geography
Cle Elum is located  ESE of Seattle,  NNW of Yakima, and  WSW of Wenatchee.

It borders South Cle Elum and Roslyn.

Climate
Cle Elum has a humid continental climate, Köppen subtype Dsb. The elevation is 1909 feet and temperatures are cooler than areas to the east. The coldest month is December, a trait common in the Pacific Northwest. But hot temperatures still occur, and not just in summer: on March 18, 1968, the temperature soared to 95 °F.

The climate has warmed in tandem with surrounding areas; climate data further back shows that winters were once colder, and that January was historically the coldest month.

Demographics

2010 census
As of the census of 2010, there were 1,872 people, 857 households, and 500 families residing in the city. The racial makeup of the city was 92.1% White, 0.4% African American, 0.7% Native American, 1.0% Asian, 0.1% Pacific Islander, 1.7% from other races, and 4.0% from two or more races. Hispanic or Latino of any race were 5.8% of the population.

There were 857 households, of which 27.9% had children under the age of 18 living with them, 39.6% were married couples living together, 12.4% had a female householder with no husband present, 6.4% had a male householder with no wife present, and 41.7% were non-families. 34.2% of all households were made up of individuals, and 13.7% had someone living alone who was 65 years of age or older. The average household size was 2.18 and the average family size was 2.76.

The median age in the city was 41 years. 22% of residents were under the age of 18; 7.7% were between the ages of 18 and 24; 25.3% were from 25 to 44; 27.6% were from 45 to 64; and 17.4% were 65 years of age or older. The gender makeup of the city was 50.2% male and 49.8% female.

2000 census
As of the census of 2000, there were 1,755 people, 792 households, and 1448 families residing in the city. The population density was 1,182.8 people per square mile (457.8/km2). There were 956 housing units at an average density of 644.3 per square mile (249.4/km2). The racial makeup of the city was 95.16% White, 0.51% African American, 1.03% Native American, 0.57% Asian, 0.85% from other races, and 1.88% from two or more races. Hispanic or Latino of any race were 3.36% of the population.

There were 792 households, out of which 67.4% had children under the age of 18 living with them, 63.1% were married couples living together, 10.9% had a female householder with no husband present, and 43.4% were non-families. 35.4% of all households were made up of individuals, and 16.2% had someone living alone who was 65 years of age or older. The average household size was 2.22 and the average family size was 2.87.

In the city, the population was spread out, with 23.2% under the age of 18, 7.6% from 18 to 24, 26.7% from 25 to 44, 24.6% from 45 to 64, and 17.9% who were 65 years of age or older. The median age was 40 years. For every 100 females, there were 93.1 males. For every 100 females age 18 and over, there were 92.3 males.

The median income for a household in the city was $28,144, and the median income for a family was $39,000. Males had a median income of $32,750 versus $26,645 for females. The per capita income for the city was $16,620. About 17.4% of families and 20.8% of the population were below the poverty line, including 22.3% of those under age 18 and 18.5% of those age 65 or over.

Notable people
Chuck Allen, American football player
Champ Butler, singer
Allen Larsen, ultramarathon cyclist
Douglas Albert Munro, the first and only member of the U.S. Coast Guard to receive the Medal of Honor
Dick Scobee, astronaut killed in the Space Shuttle Challenger disaster
George Strugar, American football player
Don Watts, American entrepreneur and founder of Swiftwater Cellars in Suncadia Resort

References

External links
 City of Cle Elum website
 Cle Elum Visitor Center
 Cle Elum Roslyn School District
 Futurepast, publisher of Coal Towns in the Cascades, A Centennial History of Roslyn and Cle Elum, Washington, 2nd Edition, by John C. Shideler
 CWU Brooks Library and Ellensburg Public Library's historic local photographs collection A collection of 294 historic photographs dating from the late 19th century to the early 20th century. The collection consists of photographic images of buildings, street scenes and town views of Ellensburg and the other communities in Kittitas County
 City of Cle Elum Library (Carpenter Memorial Library)
 The chimp sanctuary for "The Cle Elum Seven", 7 former lab animals

Cities in Washington (state)
Cities in Kittitas County, Washington
Populated places on the Yakima River
Washington placenames of Native American origin